The Comorian Women's Championship is the top flight of women's association football in Comoros. The competition is run by the Comoros Football Federation.

History
Women's football was born in Comoros on 2003 with the organisation of the women's tournament that was won by FC Mitsamiouli. On 2006, started the first edition of the Comorian Women's Championship run by the Comorian federation.

Champions
The list of champions and runners-up:

Most successful clubs

See also
 Comorian Women's Cup

References

External links 
 Football Féminin - comorosfootball.com

 
Women's association football leagues in Africa
Sports leagues established in 2006